Stian Lønne Dyngeland (born 13 February 1991) is a Norwegian footballer who plays as a forward for IF Fram Larvik. Hailing from Bergen, he has previously played for Fana, Sogndal and Lysekloster. He is the older brother of Mathias Dyngeland.

Career
Dyngeland was born in Totland in Bergen and he started his career with the local team Fana IL where he was the team's top goalscorer in the 2011 3. Divisjon with 17 goals.

Dyngeland joined Sogndal IL in 2012 after he moved to Sogndal to study, and was originally meant to play for the reserve team in the 4. divisjon. After impressing in the pre-season for Sogndal's first team, head coach Jonas Olsson decided to promote Dyngeland to the first-team squad. He made his debut for Sogndal in the opening match of the 2012 Tippeligaen season against Odd Grenland on 25 March 2012, when he replaced Malick Mane as a substitute in the 90th minute. He made his first start in Tippeligaen when Stabæk was beaten 3–1 on 15 July 2012. Dyngeland scored his first goal for Sogndal against Aalesund on 28 October 2012, when he secured a vital point in a battle against relegation after equalizing to 1–1 three minutes after he came on as a substitute. Dyngeland played a total of 13 matches in his first season with Sogndal when the team avoided relegation.

In August 2013, Dyngeland returned to his old club Fana, on loan till the end of the season.

Personal life
Dyngeland's younger brother Mathias is a goalkeeper who also plays for Sogndal. They previously played together at Fana's first team, and Mathias received a lot of attention at the age of 15 after his performance in the 2011 Norwegian Football Cup tie against Brann.

Dyngeland enjoys singing, and in 2013 he joined the competition Idol after being persuaded by Sogndal supporter and Idol judge Tone Damli Aaberge. Despite receiving praise from judge Kurt Nilsen, Dyngeland did not progress from the audition, but he stated that it might have been the best for his footballing career, given that he had to skip a training session to attend the audition.

Career statistics

References 

1991 births
Living people
Footballers from Bergen
Norwegian footballers
Fana IL players
Sogndal Fotball players
Eliteserien players
Association football forwards